Alita K. Haytayan Guillen (born c. 1970) is an American former television news anchor and reporter. She is also an entrepreneur and inventor. She is the co-owner of Gadgit Girlz, LLC. Guillen is also a communication consultant for CEOs and Hollywood celebrities.

Early life and education 

Guillén was born in Lincoln, Massachusetts, and is of Armenian descent (she took her Hispanic husband's surname). She graduated from Cushing Academy in 1988. She earned a degree in 1992 from the University of New Hampshire, where she played lacrosse and soccer. In 1996 she earned her master's degree in journalism from the University of Miami.

Professional career 

Guillen began her professional career with WABU in Boston as a reporter, anchor and sports reporter, from 1995 until 1996.

In 1997, Guillen joined WTSP-TV in St. Petersburg, Florida, where she worked as a reporter and substitute anchor until leaving the station on December 30, 1998.  In early 1999, she joined WFOR-TV in Miami, where she became a morning news anchor.  She worked at WFOR until 2002.

In 2002, Guillen was hired by WBBM-TV in Chicago as a general assignment reporter.  In mid-2003, she was promoted to be a weekend morning news anchor.  In January 2006, she became a weekend evening news anchor at WBBM, anchoring alongside Jim Williams. In 2007, she resigned to live near her family in California; she was replaced by Mai Martinez.

References 

Television anchors from Chicago
American television reporters and correspondents
American people of Armenian descent
University of New Hampshire alumni
Year of birth uncertain
1970s births
Living people